Matthew Evans, Baron Evans of Temple Guiting,  (7 August 1941 – 6 July 2016) was a British Labour Party politician. Evans' father was the writer George Ewart Evans.

Background and career
The son of George Ewart Evans and Florence Ellen Knappett, Matthew Evans was educated at Friends' School, Saffron Walden, Essex, and graduated from the London School of Economics with a Bachelor of Science degree in Economics (B.Sc.Econ.). He initially worked as a bookseller before at the age of 23 joining the publisher Faber and Faber, where by the age of 30 he had risen to become the company's managing director (1971–73) and subsequently chairman. He became a Fellow of the Royal Society of Arts (FRSA) in 1990. Evans also served as a governor of the British Film Institute and in 1999 was appointed the first chairman of the Museums, Libraries and Archives Council.

In the 1998 Birthday Honours he was appointed as a Commander of the Order of the British Empire (CBE), and on 11 May 2000 was created a life peer  as Baron Evans of Temple Guiting, of Temple Guiting in the County of Gloucestershire. In the House of Lords, he was a government whip from 2002 to 2007, and a spokesman for the Department for Constitutional Affairs from 2003. He has also served as a spokesman for the Office of the Deputy Prime Minister, the Department of Trade and Industry, the Department for Work and Pensions, and the Treasury. He left the Government in October 2007 to join Swiss Bank EFG International.

Personal life
He married Elizabeth Mead in 1966 and after their divorce in 1991 was married to literary agent Caroline Michel, until 2010. He had two sons by his first wife, and two sons and a daughter by his second wife.

Evans died on the morning of 6 July 2016 after a long illness.

References 

 ThePeerage.com

External links
 Mary Riddell, "The New Statesman Interview - Matthew Evans", New Statesman, 13 March 2000

1941 births
2016 deaths
British book publishers (people)
Evans of Temple Guiting, Matthew Evans, Baron
Evans of Temple Guiting, Matthew Evans, Baron
Evans of Temple Guiting, Matthew Evans, Baron
Alumni of the London School of Economics
Life peers created by Elizabeth II